The 2021 Marsh One-Day Cup was the 52nd season of the official List A domestic cricket competition being played in Australia. On 26 June 2020, Cricket Australia confirmed all the squads for the 2020–21 domestic cricket season. Western Australia were the defending champions.

On 16 December 2020, Cricket Australia confirmed the schedule of the tournament, with the final scheduled to be played on 30 April 2021, the latest finish to a domestic cricket season in Australia. On 10 February 2021, Cricket Australia announced the reduction of the tournament from 22 to 16 matches due to concerns over bubble fatigue, which resulted in a full schedule change.

New South Wales won the tournament, after they beat Western Australia by 102 runs in the final.

Points table

  Qualified to the finals

RESULT POINTS:

 Win – 4
 Tie – 2 each
 Match Abandoned (NR) – 1 each
 Loss – 0
 Bonus Point – 1 (Run rate 1.25 times that of opposition.)
 Additional Bonus Point – 1 (Run rate twice that of opposition.)

Fixtures

Final

Television coverage
Every match of the 2021 Marsh Cup was streamed live by Cricket Australia through their website and the CA Live app. Kayo Sports also streamed all 16 matches from the tournament. Fox Cricket broadcast 12 matches, including the final.

References

External links
 Series home at ESPN Cricinfo

Marsh One-Day Cup
Australian domestic limited-overs cricket tournament seasons
Marsh One-Day Cup
Marsh One-Day Cup, 2020-21